The Global Simplicity Index 2011 is the first ever study to calculate the cost of complexity in the world's largest organisations. The research was conducted jointly by management consultancy, Simplicity, and Warwick Business School. The Global Simplicity Index has identified that the world's largest companies lose an average of 10.2% of their EBITDA as a result of unnecessary complexity. 

The Global Simplicity Index has identified that complexity occurs in five key areas of an organisation: people, processes, organisational design, strategy, and products and services.

See also
Volatility, uncertainty, complexity and ambiguity

References 

Business analysis